Inside The Box Board Games LLP (operating as ITB) is an independent tabletop game publishing company based in London, UK. ITB was founded in 2015 by partners Matthew Usher and Peter Blenkharn while studying at Oxford University. In 2017 the company won Best Euro Game and Best Card Game at the 2017 UK Games Expo in Birmingham for their games Sub Terra and Statecraft.

Games

Molecular

The company's first board game, Molecular, was a chemistry-themed strategy game. The game ran with a limited run of under 600 copies and raised over £17,000 through its Kickstarter campaign. Three expansions, Ionic, Extreme Chemistry and Heavy Metals were also released through the Kickstarter campaign.

Statecraft

The company's second project, Statecraft, was a politically-themed strategic card game. The game was originally launched on Kickstarter in 2016 but failed to reach funding. The game was then redesigned and launched again on Kickstarter, where it successfully received over £38,000 in funding. In 2017 Statecraft was awarded Best Card Game at the UK Games Expo.

Sub Terra

In 2017 the company's third game, Sub Terra, was awarded Best Euro Game at the 2017 UK Games Expo (UKGE). The game was designed by Tim Pinder, who joined ITB after exhibiting his prototype at the UKGE Wyvern's Lair event. Sub Terra was published through a Kickstarter campaign in which it raised over £350,000 and also inspired an art book and graphic novel. Sub Terra was awarded Best Euro Game at the 2017 UK Games Expo.

Appearances in the media

In 2016 managing partner Peter Blenkharn joined an open letter signed by British business owners condemning proposed restrictions on foreign workers. 

In 2017 Blenkharn was interviewed by New Statesman in an article about the contemporary success of the board games hobby, in which he talked about the growth of British board game companies into an international industry.

References

Board game publishing companies